The Couch may refer to:
 The Couch (Seinfeld), an episode of NBC sitcom Seinfeld
 The Couch (film), a 1962 American psychological horror film
 "The Couch", a song by Alanis Morissette from Supposed Former Infatuation Junkie
 "The Couch", a song by Baron Longfellow